Ramon "Dale" Singson (born December 2, 1975) is a Filipino former professional basketball player. He last played for the Powerade Tigers in the Philippine Basketball Association. He plays the Point Guard and Shooting Guard positions. He was directly hired by the Shell Turbo Chargers from the MBA in 2000. He was known as a scorer who can play both guard positions.

College career
Singson played intercollegiate basketball with the University of Santo Tomas in the UAAP. He helped lead his alma mater to multiple championships.

Professional career
Singson had a 10 year PBA career that saw him play for five teams (Shell, SMB, Coke, and Alaska).

References

External links
https://basketball.asia-basket.com/player/Dale-Singson/25013
http://www.alaskaaces.com.ph/dale-singson-43.html
https://www.project-sydrified.com/post/pba-stats-dale-singson

Living people
Filipino men's basketball players
1975 births
UST Growling Tigers basketball players
Sportspeople from Cebu City
Basketball players from Cebu
Point guards
Shell Turbo Chargers players
San Miguel Beermen players
Powerade Tigers players
Alaska Aces (PBA) players
Cebuano people